Chocolate Starfish is the debut studio album by Australian rock music group, Chocolate Starfish, The album was released in April 1994 and peaked at number 2 on the ARIA Charts. The album spawned five singles and was certified Platinum.

Track listing

Charts

Weekly charts

Year-end charts

Certifications

Release history

References

1994 debut albums
Chocolate Starfish albums
EMI Records albums